Brockman is an unincorporated community in Lassen County, California.

A post office operated at Brockman from 1911 to 1919.

References

Unincorporated communities in California
Unincorporated communities in Lassen County, California